Copelatus sociennus is a species of diving beetle. It is part of the subfamily Copelatinae in the family Dytiscidae. It was described by J. Balfour-Browne in 1952. The species can be found on Coloane and in Seac Pai Van. It feeds on Nelumbo nucifera.

References

sociennus
Beetles described in 1952